William James (born William James Peterson, Jr.; June 15, 1979) is a former American football cornerback. He was drafted by the New York Giants in the third round of the 2001 NFL Draft. He played college football at Western Illinois.

James was also a member of the Philadelphia Eagles, Buffalo Bills, Jacksonville Jaguars, Detroit Lions, and San Francisco 49ers.

College career
James (then known as Will Peterson) attended the University of Michigan for two years, studying fashion design, one of them with the school's 1997 national championship team, before finishing his collegiate career at Western Illinois University with a brief stint at Youngstown State in Ohio between the two.  In his senior season at Western Illinois, James started 10 games.  He finished his college career with 96 tackles (77 solo), nine interceptions, two sacks, and 11 tackles for losses.  He averaged over 26 yards per interception return and scored two defensive touchdowns.

Professional career

New York Giants
In his rookie NFL season with the Giants in 2001, James played in all sixteen games, starting in five of them.  In 2002, he started all 12 games in which he played, but missed four due to injuries.  In 2003, James started five games, but missed the rest of the season because of a stress fracture in his lower back.  In 2004, James played in every regular season game for the Giants, and started fifteen of them.  James was released by the Giants on Friday May 26, 2006; the Giants waived him because of severe back problems and health issues related to stress fractures in his lower back.

Philadelphia Eagles
James signed with the Philadelphia Eagles on October 30, 2006 and played with the team for two seasons before becoming a free agent in 2008.

Buffalo Bills
On March 18, 2008, James was signed by the Buffalo Bills to a two-year contract, but was released on August 30 during final cuts.

Jacksonville Jaguars
James was signed by the Jacksonville Jaguars on September 1, 2008. The Jacksonville Jaguars released William James on Thursday, June 11, 2009.

Detroit Lions
James signed with the Detroit Lions on July 28, 2009.

San Francisco 49ers
James was signed by the San Francisco 49ers on May 5, 2010. His contract expired at season's end, making him an unrestricted free agent.

Personal life

Name change
Upon signing with the Eagles, James officially dropped the Peterson Jr. from his name.

References
 Joshua Stevens
Andre M Stevens. Frank Tomasino

External links
Jacksonville Jaguars bio

1979 births
Living people
American football cornerbacks
Players of American football from Pennsylvania
Buffalo Bills players
Jacksonville Jaguars players
Michigan Wolverines football players
New York Giants players
Philadelphia Eagles players
San Francisco 49ers players
Western Illinois Leathernecks football players
People from Uniontown, Pennsylvania